Fort Osage High School is a high school located at 2101 N. Twyman Rd. in unincorporated Jackson County, Missouri, in the Kansas City metropolitan area, adjacent to Independence. It belongs to the Fort Osage R-1 School District and serves a section of northern Independence.

It currently serves approximately 1,500 students from grades 9-12. It is named after the Fort Osage National Historic Landmark along the Missouri River in nearby Sibley, Missouri.

Athletics
Fort Osage's baseball team has appeared in three 4A state championships having won in 1991 and 1997, and finishing as runners up in 1996.

Since 2009, Fort Osage's football team has appeared in the Class 5 state championship game 5 times in 2009, 2012, 2015, 2018, and 2022. They won the state championship game in 2015.

Fall athletics
  Football
  Cross Country
  Golf (Girls)
  Soccer (Boys)
  Softball
  Tennis (Girls)
  Volleyball

Winter athletics
  Basketball (Boys)
  Basketball (Girls)
  Wrestling

Spring athletics
  Baseball
  Golf (Boys)
  Soccer (Girls)
  Tennis (Boys)
  Track & Field

Spirit squads
  Cheerleading
  Indianettes (dance team)

Fort Osage activities

Fine Arts activities

Fort Osage Bands
  Symphonic Band
  Wind Ensemble
  Jazz Band
  Show Band
  Fort Osage Marching Band, The Red & White Brigade

Other fine arts
  Drama
  Choir
  Art Club
  Student Publications Indian Legends (yearbook)

Clubs and other activities
  Computer Science Club
  Fort Supporter's Club
  Student Council
  National Honor Society (NHS)
  National Art Honors Society (NAHS)
  Rotary Club
  Future Farmers of America (FFA)
  Scholar Bowl
  Family, Career, and Community Leaders of America (FCCLA)
  Speech + Debate
  Special Olympics
  Chess Club
  Health Occupations Students of America (HOSA)
  Club 121

Notable alumni

Albert Pujols, MLB player for the St. Louis Cardinals
Betty Lennox, WNBA player for the Los Angeles Sparks
Chris Metzler, documentary filmmaker
Chad Troutwine, co-founder of Veritas Prep, movie producer
E. J. Gaines, NFL player for the Buffalo Bills
Bruce Van Dyke, NFL drafted by Philadelphia Eagles, 1966, also played for the Pittsburgh Steelers, 1967-1973, and the Green Bay Packers, 1974-1976
Skylar Thompson, quarterback for the Miami Dolphins

References

External links
 Fort Osage High School
 Fort Osage High School (old website)

High schools in Jackson County, Missouri
Public high schools in Missouri